Simon de Bokminster (fl. 1295), was an English politician.

He was a Member (MP) of the Parliament of England for Rutland in November 1295, alongside Robert de Flixthorpe.

References

13th-century births
Year of death missing
English MPs 1295